Luteipulveratus halotolerans is a bacterium from the genus of Luteipulveratus which has been isolated from forest soil from Sarawak in Malaysia.

References

Micrococcales
Bacteria described in 2015